The Room Upstairs is a 1987 American made-for-television drama film based on the novel The Room Upstairs by Norma Levinson, starring Stockard Channing, Sam Waterston, Joan Allen and Linda Hunt. The young Jerry O'Connell, Devoreaux White and Sarah Jessica Parker all have small supporting roles. The film aired as a Hallmark Hall of Fame presentation on CBS on January 31, 1987 and was later distributed on DVD.

Plot
Leah Lazenby (Stockard Channing) is a single woman who lives in a house she recently inherited from her parents. In order to save money, maintaining her inheritance, she lets rooms to a variety of tenants while she sleeps in her parents' parlour. Leah works in a school for children who are characterized by a learning disability or even antisocial personality disorder.

A cellist named Travis Coles (Sam Waterston) visits to inquire about the upstairs room to let. He can easily pay in advance and is immediately accepted.

Travis fits in very well. He flatters Leah when she's plumbing, helps the other tenants, takes photographs of Leah and her pupils, drives her around in his car, and guards her when she is assaulted by her tenant Kevin (Clancy Brown). Consequently, Leah turns to Travis when she needs to bring Kevin's wife Ellie (Joan Allen) to a hospital. Ellie had just tried to commit suicide because the Kevin had betrayed and eventually left her.

Leah's head teacher (Linda Hunt) assigns her to look after an unruly illiterate teenage girl named Susan (Renée Estevez), who refuses to attend school. Susan lives with her boyfriend. Leah visits her regularly and tries to teach her to read by using fashion magazines. She even includes Susan's boyfriend, but when she thinks Susan opens up to her, the girl plays a cruel trick on Leah, causing Leah to lose her patience and start a physical fight with Susan in public. As the police arrive, Susan falsely accuses her of having assaulted her with a broken bottle and Leah leaves.

Returning home Leah sees Travis repairing the sink and tells him off. Travis answers back by explaining to her she mustn't believe she was the only person who is hurt and she should be more interested in Ellie's problems. Leah then talks to Ellie and they become friends.

Head teacher Mrs. Sanders convinces Leah not to quit her job as a teacher and offers her a different task. While Travis is on a concert tour in Canada, Leah's tenant Mandy (Sarah Jessica Parker) gives birth to a baby. There is a big celebration in Leah's house and Travis can manage to visit during a break of the tour.

Travis and Leah have a moment together. Leah tells him about her new case, a deafblind child. Having his shoulder to lean on she falls asleep. While she rests Travis inducts Leah into the tragedy of his life. He once had a child who died unexpectedly while he was on tour, his wife blaming him for having neglected his family. The next morning they awake together, obviously feeling very comfortable.

Leah's brother Frank (James Handy) is angry with her because the house is returning a puny profit although she's now also her tenant Mandy's babysitter. Even so, she refuses her brother's offer to buy her out.
 
Travis takes Leah to one of his concerts. When they return home she invites him to her room where she has prepared a meal for them. Finally they kiss.

External links

Hallmark Hall of Fame episodes
1987 television films
1987 films
Films based on American novels
Films scored by Robert Folk